The 1918 Florida Gators football team represented the University of Florida during the 1918 college football season. The season was the second for Alfred L. Buser as Florida's head coach. The Gators' ranks were depleted by the Spanish flu and the loss of World War I military volunteers and draftees, and Florida played only one game—a 2–14 loss to a football team from Camp Johnston, a U.S. Army training installation in nearby Jacksonville, Florida. Buser's Gators did not play a Southern Intercollegiate Athletic Association (SIAA) conference schedule in 1918.

Schedule

References

Florida
Florida Gators football seasons
College football winless seasons
Florida Gators football